Idrottens Hus is an arena venue in Helsingborg, Sweden. The stadium was built in 1957.

See also
 List of tennis stadiums by capacity

External links
Davis Cup Sep 2009 Sweden-Romania
Davis Cup Feb 2003 Sweden-Brazil
Davis Cup Feb 2001 Sweden-Czech Republic
Idrottens Hus detail

Indoor arenas in Sweden
Sports venues completed in 1957
Buildings and structures in Helsingborg